Linnsburg is a small unincorporated community in Walnut Township, Montgomery County, in the U.S. state of Indiana. The town is a former whistle stop on the Monon branch and still has active rail service today from Nucor Steel to Avon.

History
Linnsburg was platted by Susan McMullen in 1870. A post office was established at Linnsburg in 1887, and remained in operation until 1934.

In the early hours of May 13, 1995 an F-2 tornado struck this small community and killed two people as they slept in their beds.  There was no warning.  The storm damaged portions of Nucor Steel, Walnut Township Elementary School, and several homes and farms.  Police officers and fire fighters from all around the county converged on the scene and spent hours digging through the rubble for survivors. This was part of a series of tornadoes that struck the Midwest.

Geography

References

Unincorporated communities in Montgomery County, Indiana
Unincorporated communities in Indiana